Pyrali Hanalievich Aliyev (born 13 January 1984) is a Kazakhstani former footballer who played as a midfielder.

Club career
In December 2014, Aliyev left FC Ordabasy, signing for FC Irtysh Pavlodar later the same month.

References

External links

Living people
1984 births
Kazakhstani footballers
Association football midfielders
Kazakhstan international footballers
FC Kairat players
FC Astana players
FC Atyrau players
FC Zhenis Astana players
FC Tobol players
FC Ordabasy players
FC Irtysh Pavlodar players
FC Kyzylzhar players
Kazakhstan Premier League players
Kazakhstan First Division players